Natalya Mikhaylovna Shubenkova (born 25 September 1957) is a Russian former Soviet heptathlete.  As of 2019, she ranks as the 12th highest all-time female scorer in the heptathlon, based on a score of 6859 she achieved in 1984. That ended up being the second highest score in 1984, bested only by Sabine John, and stood as the Soviet record for six years. She was unable to participate in the 1984 Olympics due to the 1984 Summer Olympics boycott.

Shubenkova was part of the Soviet athletic team from 1980 to 1992, and won several nationwide championships in the heptathlon.  Other top performances included a fourth-place finish at the 1988 Olympics, and a bronze medal at the 1986 Goodwill Games.

After retiring from competitions, Shubenkova served as a sports administrator in her native Altai Krai. Her son Sergey Shubenkov won the world title in 110 metres hurdles in 2015.

International competitions

References

Living people
1957 births
People from Altai Krai
Soviet heptathletes
Soviet female athletes
Olympic athletes of the Soviet Union
Athletes (track and field) at the 1988 Summer Olympics
World Athletics Championships athletes for the Soviet Union
Russian heptathletes
Russian female athletes
Goodwill Games medalists in athletics
Competitors at the 1986 Goodwill Games
Sportspeople from Altai Krai